Robert Kirby (26 April 1936 – 10 February 2007) was a famous South African satirist, playwright, comedian, novelist, columnist and musician who died in 2007 following complications from a heart operation, four months prior.

Career
Kirby started his career in the early ’60s as a broadcaster at the SABC where he presented The Early Morning Programme. He became well known for his brand of satirical humour and his sharp wit—both of which were demonstrated in his later column in the South African newspaper, Mail & Guardian. Kirby is particularly remembered for his plays and reviews which were highly monitored due to his liberal attitude to apartheid.

Kirby also wrote specialist essays on fly fishing and on Aviation, whilst putting in many hours flying for the Red Cross.

Awards
Kirby was twice awarded the English Academy of Southern Africa’s Thomas Pringle Award for journalism, in 1996 and 2002, for his reviews and for an educational article respectively.

Quotes
“You can’t have humour without offending somebody. Every joke offends somebody down the line. Humour that didn’t plunge the knife into somebody’s ribs would be terribly pale, vapid, weak.”
“I believe that we can do without censorship. I do not believe that censorship saves us from anarchy. It serves very little apart from itself. There has been no noticeable decline in pornography as a result of censorship.”
“I don't think much about the SABC - after all - they don't think that much about me... But I do think their graphics on the news are marvellous. We're doing a thing on them in the show. You know what I mean. The hunger strikes are symbolised by a load of bread crossed out... that sort of thing.”

Bibliography
Reviews
 Finger Trouble
 Finger Trouble 2
 Eight Beasts
 Eight Birds
 Heliotrope Bouquet
 Quodlibet
 Brave New Pretoria
 How Now Sacred Cow
 Separate Development

Plays
 Gentlemen
 It’s a Boy!
 Panics
 Weedkillers
 Wrong Time of Year
 The Bijers Sunbird
 The Secret Letters of Jan Van Riebeek

TV Sitcoms
 Louis Motors

Columns
 Channel Vision—The Star Tonight
 Loose Cannon—The Mail and Guardian
 The Agony Aunt—The Sunday Independent
 ???—The Financial Mail

Books
 Trebor Ybrik Versus the Rest
 It’s a Boy!
 The Secret Letters of Jan Van Riebeeck
 Rude Shelters
 Songs of the Cockroach
 Fly-Fishing in Southern Africa

References

Sources
M&G biography
The Guardian
Sunday Times

1936 births
2007 deaths
Writers from Durban
South African writers
South African male comedians
20th-century comedians